Jeff A. Hoverson is an American politician, pastor and businessman who serves as a Republican member of the North Dakota House of Representatives. He represents the 3rd district alongside Bob Paulson.

Biography
Hoverson grew up in Dahlen, North Dakota. He holds a bachelor's degree in education from Valley City State University and a master of divinity from Lutheran Brethren Seminary. He is a former public school teacher and operates a LoVE Ice Cream food truck with his family.

From 2004 until 2010, Hoverson was a pastor at Bread of Life. He has been a pastor at Living World Lutheran Church since 2010. In March 2018, he announced that he was running for state representative. He and fellow Republic Bob Paulson won the June primary and the November general election. Hoverson took office on December 1, 2018, and serves on the committees on education, government and veterans affairs.

Hoverson is married to JoAnn and they have six children.

References

Living people
Year of birth missing (living people)
Republican Party members of the North Dakota House of Representatives
People from Nelson County, North Dakota
Valley City State University alumni
21st-century American Lutheran clergy
21st-century American politicians